Uvanilla babelis is a species of sea snail, a marine gastropod mollusk in the family Turbinidae, the turban snails.

Description
The shell attains a height of 21 mm, its diameter 19 mm. The imperforate, elevated shell has a conic shape with an acute apex. Its color pattern is pale yellowish. The seven whorls are slightly convex, obliquely radiately costate with distant folds, which are prominently nodulose at the sutures and periphery. The interstices are smooth. The body whorl is carinated, the carina bearing about eight nodules. The flat base of the shell is smooth, with fine oblique incremental striae. The aperture angulated. The columellar region is white, blue margined, and unidentate at its base.

Distribution
This species occurs in the Pacific Ocean off South America

References

 Keen M. (1971). Sea shells of Tropical West America. Marine mollusks from Baja California to Perú. (2nd edit.). Stanford University Press pp. 1064

External links
Gastropods.com: Astraea (Uvanilla) babelis

babelis
Gastropods described in 1874